Pranab Kumar Chowdhury is a Bangladeshi pediatrician, academic and writer. He authored many books on child healthcare as well as children's fictions in Bengali. He also co-authored a text book on paediatrics. He was awarded 'Swadhinata Smarak Sommanona Padak' by Chittagong City Corporation in 2017 for his contribution in child healthcare. He regularly writes articles on children's care in popular newspapers. His six-part book on children's healthcare in Bengali (Chhotoder Chikitsha Samagra: Children's treatment omnibus) was lauded by Shamsuzzaman Khan and Anisuzzaman. He is the former professor and head of the Department of Paediatrics, Chittagong Medical College, Chittagong, Bangladesh.

Early life and education 
Pranab was born in Chittagong, Bangladesh in 1960.  He passed MBBS from Chittagong Medical College in 1984. He obtained FCPS in paediatrics from Bangladesh College of Physicians and Surgeons in 1995. He received FRCP from Royal College of Physicians and Surgeons of Glasgow.

Publications

Research works 
Pranab published many research articles and reviews on paediatrics in reputed journals. He is also a member of editorial board of Bangladesh Journal of Child Health.

Child healthcare 
Source:

 Chhotoder chikitsha samagra: parts 1–6; Rup Prokashon
 Shishu Niramoy; Somoy Prakashan
 Shishur Jibon ; Agamee Prakashani
 Shishur Khaoa Daoa (Feeding and Nutrition of Children; 2005); Anupam Prakashani. 
 Baby Care: Preventive child health ; Anupam Prakashny.  
 Tumi kivabe bhalo thakbe (2015) Prothoma Prokashon
 Bacchar Dekhashona ; Puthiniloy
 Shishur Oshukh bishukh O Protikar ; Gronthokutir
 Chhotoder Swasthyo; Agamee Prakashani
 Shishur Kon Oshukhe Ki Koroniyo ; Somoy Pralashan
 Jibonbhor Nirog Shishu(Snake bite and management); Puthiniloy
 Shishurog Porichoy; Grontho Kutir
 Shishu Samagra; Puthiniloy
 Shishu Nursing O Sebika; Anupam Prakashani.  
 Ananda Ujjwal Paramayu Amonojogi Danpite Shishu; Rup Prokashon
 Shishur Swasthyo Kushol; Mowla Brothers
 Shishu Swasthyo O Chikitsha; Mowla Brothers
 Shishur lifestyle; Anupam Prakashani. 
 Shishur Sohoj Daktari; Somoy ProkashonProkashon
 Shishur Ityadi; Somoy Prokashon
 Apnar Shishur Swasthyo Diary; Somoy Prokashon
 Sontan Chhele na Meye; Rup Prokashon.

Short stories 
Source:

 Chhoto prescroptioner golpo; Mowla Brothers
 Prescriptioner Golpo; Rup Prokashon

Novels 
Source:

 Daktar O Debshishu (2014); Somoy Prakashan
 Hummu's ashcorjo kolom  (2017); Rup Prokashon 
 Debshishu; Puthiniloy

Poetry 
Source:

 Valentine priya (2017); Rup Prokashon. 
 Daktar Mamar Swasthyo Bachan; Karat Prokash
 Daktar Mamar Chhora Golpo ; Anupam Prakashani 
 Ishwar Shunyo Ishwar; Rup Prokashon
 Ma O 5 Magh Shahbagh; Rup Prokashon

Pediatric textbook 
 A Simple Textbook of Pediatrics (2003); Pranab Kumar Chowdhury, S. Hossain

Personal life 
He is married to Sulekha Chowdhury. The couple has two daughters and a son.

Awards and honors 

 Swadhinata Smarak Sommanona Padak 2017 by Chittagong City Corporation 
 Honored by Chittagong Academy in 2019 for his contribution in child healthcare, literature.
 Ahmed Sofa Sahitya Puroshkar in 2019 for  Debshishu
 Digonto Dhara Sahitya Puroshkar-2019 for Debshishu

References 

Living people
1960 births
Bangladeshi pediatricians